The fourth Annual MTV Romania Music Awards were held in Sala Palatului on April 28, 2005.

Nominees/Winners

Best Hip-Hop
Sişu & Puya - Foame De Bani
Parazitii ft. Larry Flynt - Jos Cenzura
Ombladon ft. Raku - Egali Din Naştere WINNER
Bitza & Tataee - Următorul Pas
BUG Mafia - O Lume Nebună, Nebună De Tot

Best New Act
Bitza - Următorul Pas
M&G - Asalt Raggafonic
Morandi - Love Me
Pavel Stratan - Eu Beu WINNER
Planeta Moldova - Alimentara

Best Female
Andra - Doar O Clipă
Delia - Parfum De Fericire
Loredana - Extravaganza
Miki - Fără Tine
Nicola - Îţi Multumesc WINNER

Best Male
Bitza - Vorbeste Vinul
Ombladon - Egali De Naştere
Pavel Stratan - Eu Beu
Pepe - Numai Iubirea WINNER
Ștefan Bănică, Jr. - Iubeşte-o Sincer

Best Song
Activ - Doar Cu Tine WINNER
Hi-Q - Gaşca Mea
Impact - Baby
Morandi - Love Me
Ombladon ft. Raku - Egali Din Naştere

Best Album
Activ - Motive
Bitza - Sevraj
Impact - Babe
Parazitii - Primii 10 Ani WINNER
Voltaj - Povestea Oricui

Best Live Act
Loredana vs. Sistem - RMA 04
Parazitii - ClubJ, MTV Live
Viorica şi Ioniţă din Clejani vs. DJ Allstar - RMA 04
Vita De Vie - ClubJ, MTV Live WINNER
Zdob Si Zdub - ClubJ, MTV Live

Best Website
www.andreeab.ro WINNER
www.clubimpact.ro
www.directia5.com
www.proconsul.com.ro
www.vitadevie.ro

Best Dance
Activ - Doar Cu Tine
Hi-Q - Gaşca Mea
Impact - Baby (Impact song)
Morandi - Love Me WINNER
Simplu - 10

Best Etno
Etnic & Haiducii - Zorilor (song) WINNER
Ro-Mania - Basca
Tom Boxer - Căciula Pe-O Ureche
Viorica şi Ioniţă din Clejani - Vraja (song)
Zdob Si Zdub - Cucusor

Best Pop
Class - Pentru Dragoste
Directia 5 - Eşti Îngerul Meu WINNER
Nicola - De Mă Vei Chema
Sistem ft. Alexandra Ungureanu - Departe De Tine
Voltaj - Şi Ce?

Best Group
Activ - Doar Cu Tine
Directia 5 - Eşti Îngerul Meu
Hi-Q - Gaşca Mea
Parazitii - Fuck You Romania
Voltaj - Şi Ce? WINNER

Best Rock
Cargo - Nu Pot Trăi Fără Tine WINNER
Firma (band) - Important
Praf In Ochi - 1000 De Gânduri
Vita De Vie - Îmi Pasă
Zdob Si Zdub - DJ Vasile

Best Video
Sensor (band) - Help Yourself

Lifetime Award
Teo Peter (post mortem)

References

MTV Romania Music Awards
2005 in Romanian music
Romanian music awards